Following is a list of notable people from Gorgan, the capital of Golestan Province in northern Iran.

Notables from Gorgan

Contemporary prominent figures
Mohammad Reza Lotfi, Musician.
Maryam Zandi, Photographer.

Historical figures
 Abd-al-Qaher Jorjani, Grammarian and literary theorist. 
 Mir Damad
 Gorgani, Zayn al-Din Isma‘il ibn, royal physician
 Gorgani, Abu Saeed, astronomer and mathematician
 Gorgani, Rustam, physician
 Masihi Gorgani, Avicenna's master
 Ali ibn Mohammed al-Jurjani, encyclopedic writer and theologian
 Fazlallah Astarabadi, 14th century Islamic mystic and founder of the Hurufi movement
 Bibi Khatoon Astarabadi, a notable writer, satirist, and one of the pioneering figures of the women's movement of Iran

Mayors after the Islamic Revolution, February 1979 onwards

 Ebrahim Karimi (son of Abbass), holder of B.A. in Theology  & Islamic Laws
 Ebrahim Karimi (son of Abbass), appointed (selected by the Gorgan City Islamic Council), in June 2007, for the 2nd time

Famous guests

Califs

Abbasid Calif Harun Al-Rashid
Imam Reza

Gorgan